The Maikathari (Mayi-Thakurti) were an Aboriginal Australian people of the state of Queensland.

Country
Running north, its boundaries touched Canobie on the Cloncurry River, and extended east to where Julia Creek joins the Cloncurry, and also to Mount Fort Bowen. They were also present at Dalgonally.

Social organisation and rites
They did not practise either circumcision or subincision.

Alternative names
 Maiðakuri
 Maiðakui
 Maidhagudi, Maitakudi
 Mayatagoorri
 Mythugadi
 Majadhagudi
 Mythuggadi
 Mythaguddi, Mitagurdi, Mittagurdi, Mitagurdi, Mitakoodi, Mittakoodi.
 Mitrogoordi, Mitroogoordi

Notes

Citations

Sources

Aboriginal peoples of Queensland